"When the Moon Comes Over the Mountain" is a popular song, published in 1931, and credited as written by Howard Johnson, Harry M. Woods, and Kate Smith. As Johnson is primarily known as a lyricist and Woods, when collaborating with lyricists, primarily wrote music, the actual apportionment of the credits would be likely to be music by Woods, lyrics by Johnson, and possibly some small contribution by Smith in order to give her a share of royalty income.

This song was hummed by Groucho Marx during the breakfast scene in the 1935 film A Night at the Opera.

References in pop  culture
In the Three Stooges film short "Dizzy Doctors" from 1937 Moe Howard gets on a PA system and says "Hello everybody, we just brought the moon over the mountain." in reference to this song.

In popular culture
This is the song that Kate Smith sang for King George VI and Queen Elizabeth when they visited The White House in 1939.

References

1931 songs
1931 singles
Kate Smith songs
Songs with lyrics by Howard Johnson (lyricist)
Songs written by Harry M. Woods